An aquapelago is an assemblage of marine and terrestrial elements in which the aquatic spaces are key to community livelihoods and to communities’ senses of identity and belonging. Aquapelago refers to the socially constructed spaces of island, coastal, lacustrine or riverine locations, where humans have developed particularly concentrated engagements with the marine environment for their livelihoods (such as fishing or gathering aquatic plants) or leisure (such as surfing or diving). A neologism, aquapelago denotes the manner in which environmental psychology has been key to various maritime communities and causes in recent years. For example, the famous Mabo decision on indigenous Australian native title in 1992, successfully argued that areas of the seabed, and the aquatic resources above them, were part of traditional Torres Strait Islander community territories and related senses of communal homelands.

Concept and etymology

The term aquapelago was introduced in 2012 in Shima online journal of research into island and maritime cultures. The term subsequently gained momentum in geography, anthropology, and cultural studies, since it addresses a conceptual and lexical gap in topical discourse on the human relationship to nature. More recently, the concept has extended in reach to creative fields such as theatre, science fiction, and music.

In its initial coinage, etymologically, the term replaces the initial two syllables of the well-known term archipelago with aqua in order to reassert the role of marine elements in aggregations of islands that has been largely lost from contemporary usage of archipelago. The concept has been further elaborated, linking it to livelihood activities and to the Japanese concept of shima (referring to islands and related distinct cultural landscapes). This concept is striking in that it conceives of combined terrestrial and aquatic spaces as, effectively, neighborhoods.

The concept of aquapelago has been envisaged as a reflection on the Anthropocene and as:

  
Subsequent developments of the concept have analysed its applicability to topics such as ocean spaces and national rights of access to these, cultural practices in Melanesian coastal societies and career making in island communities. The original analyses of the aquapelago have been further expanded by addressing metropolitan locales and providing a characterisation of Manhattan as an aquapelagic city that was subsequently critiqued and modified. While there have been critics of the concept, some who regard the term as unnecessary in that archipelagic analyses can be extended to address aquatic elements, writers from various disciplines have engaged with the concept in a positive manner, such as an exploration of the concept with regard to water ecology themed performance works in the journal Women’s Studies Quarterly and a discussion of a geopolitical aesthetic of the subterranean in the journal Geopolitics. Further, the lens of the aquapelago can act as a bridge between the fields of island studies and studies examining seasteading.

Associated concepts

One significant development of the concept of the aquapelago has concerned the notion of there being an “aquapelagic imaginary).” This concept has been subsequently elaborated in a theme issue of the journal Shima on mermaids, mer-cultures and the aquapelagic imaginary to refer to the manner in which communities’ “engagements with their aquapelagic locales” in folk-/media-loric contexts can be understood to reflect upon and transcend “perceptions of the limits of human presence in and experience of aquatic spaces.” In an article analysing the creation of a modern mythic entity, the Ningen, a creature rumoured to inhabit the southern Pacific Ocean, there is a discussion about the aquapelagic imaginary as a “subset" of the "social imaginary”, which can be regarded as a historically determined “enabling but not fully explicable symbolic matrix within which a people imagine and act as world-making collective agents”.

Aquapelago and the arts 
The European record label Discrepant Records has recently begun to release a number of albums of experimental music inspired by the concept of the aquapelago. The first release was the compilation album Aquapelago: an oceans anthology (2022).

Further reading 
Various peer-reviewed articles contributing to the development of the concept of aquapelago are anthologised online at: https://shimajournal.org/anthologies.php

References 

Islands